Doosan Handball Club is a handball club based in South Gyeongsang Province, South Korea. Founded in 1991, they compete in the Handball Korea League and are the most successful club in the league, having won the competition a record ten times.

Honours 
Handball Korea League
Winners (10): 2011, 2012, 2013, 2015, 2016, 2017, 2018–19, 2019–20, 2020–21, 2021–22
Runners-up: 2014

South Korean Handball Festivals
Winners (7): 1993, 1994, 1995, 2002–03, 2003–04, 2009, 2010
Runners-up (5): 1996, 1997, 2000, 2005–06, 2007

References

South Korean handball clubs
Handball clubs established in 1991
Sport in Seoul
Handball
1991 establishments in South Korea